Daxton Paul James Monaghan (born 31 October 1972) is an Australian musician and songwriter based on the Central Coast, New South Wales. He released numerous albums and performed regularly along the east coast. Daxton's music was aired on national radio stations, and been used on television soundtracks. His style has varied over his career and is predominantly southern blues/rock.

Biography 

Daxton Paul James Monaghan was born on 31 October 1972 on the Central Coast, New South Wales. He attended St Edward's College, East Gosford until age 16. Daxton worked in a range of jobs: printing, door to door sales and hospitality.

At 19 years old, Daxton, on guitar and lead vocals, formed his first band, Horus, with school mates, Matt Casey on bass guitar and Jamie Foster on drums. They were influenced by late 1980s artists, Living Colour, Suicidal Tendencies, Frank Zappa, and Captain Beefheart. His second band, Egg, from the mid- to late 1990s showed a continued influence from Zappa. Their line-ups included, Christian McBride on drums and Spencer Price on bass guitar. They performed in the Sydney to Newcastle area.

Daxton progressed through a number of musical styles including funk, grunge, jazz, lap steel and settled into a southern blues/rock format late in the 1990s. Early in the next decade he re-joined Casey in a Sydney-based band, Low Yield Atomics, with Raelene Solomons on drums, which were a punk-rock outfit from 2001 to 2002. After they disbanded Daxton played occasional solo gigs.

In 2008 Daxton released an album, Two Roads, with country musician, Bill Chambers as producer. This led to performances at the Tamworth Music festival in 2009 and other blues and country festivals and gigs subsequently.

In 2009 he fronted Daxton & the Sweet Lips and their first release was on iTunes with the self-titled album, which had a heavy distorted blues sound with elements of rock. An album track, "Moody Liz", was used on American TV series, Dollhouse. It received  an honourable mention at the International Songwriting Competition in the blues category. The Sweet Lips line-up included Mike Rix on bass, Shayne Brown on drums and Ken Stanhope on harmonica.

In 2009 Daxton joined Sydney musicians and entertainers Andy Kent from You Am I, Jeff O'Connell from Headache, Shayne Pinington and Adam Yee from Smudge for a series of gigs at the Annandale Hotel under the name “The baby baby baby baby yeah yeah yeah's,” a Cult tribute band. Daxton performed as lead singer.

2009 also saw Daxton receive significant airplay on CMC television in Australia with the clip for the song "Two Roads" which was Produced by Cory Hopper (who also produced Kasey Chambers album Wayward Angel.)

In 2010 Daxton toured from Australia to the US and played a number of shows on the west coast and at Nashville including shows at the Douglas Corner Cafe, the Blue Bird Cafe in Nashville and the Hollywood Piano Bar in Los Angeles.

In 2011 Daxton & the Sweet Lips recorded the Thin Tall Lily album which was published by Foghorn Records and was recorded at Damien Gerard Studios. It received international distribution.

Career highlights

Awards 

 Appeared several times in 2011 Australian Blues Top 25 charts
 International Song Writing Competition 2010
 Triple J Unearthed, 2004 Runner Up
 Number 3 on Australian blues charts 2011

Discography

Bands and associations 

 Horus
 Latex Rubber Skinhead
 Egg
 Low Yield Atomics
 Daxton and the Desirables
 The Baby Baby Baby Baby Yeah Yeah Yeahs
 Daxton and the Sweet Lips

Notable appearances 

 Tamworth Country Music Festival, 2011, 2010, 2009
 Sydney Blues and Roots Festival, 2011
 Ironfest, 2012, 2011
 Newtown Festival, 2002

References

External links 

 
 ISC Previous winners
 2011 Sydney Blues festival
 Australian Blues Charts
 Australian Country Music Channel (TV)
 Baby Baby Baby Baby Yeah! Youtube clip and Gig notice

Australian singer-songwriters
1972 births
Living people
21st-century Australian singers